Bishtyubinka is a rural locality (a selo) in Starokucherganovsky Selsoviet, Narimanovsky District, Astrakhan Oblast, Russia. The population was 1,117 as of 2010. There is 1 street.

Geography 
Bishtyubinka is located 46 km south of Narimanov (the district's administrative centre) by road. Trusovo is the nearest rural locality.

References 

Rural localities in Narimanovsky District